Children's Palace may refer to

Child World, a toy store company which operated a chain of stores titled Children's Palace
Vorontsov's Palace (Odessa), also titled Children's Palace
Children's Palace (China) (in ), Government-funded recreation centres for minors throughout China
Mangyongdae Children's Palace, in Pyongyang, North Korea